Otto Simon is a Dutch importer, distributor, and franchiser of toys and homeware, headquartered in Almelo.

History 
The company was founded in 1911 by Otto Simon. At that time it was mainly a peddler company, specializing in beads and glassware. After the World War II, the emphasis shifted more to toys. In 1955 the company became a Private Company. Until 1970 the company was independent and grew into one of the largest toy importers in Europe. Domestically, it had a market share of 80%. 

Since 1997, the company has evolved from a wholesaler into a retail organisation, with its own toy formulas such as Speelboom, Wigwam, Technohobby and Early Learning Centre. In 1999 it was announced that the ELC formula would be discontinued and in 2000 the formulas Wigwam and Speelboom were transferred to the new formula Top1Toys. In 2003, Ruud Schiphorst became the new owner of Otto Simon.

In 2021, the Marskramer, Novy, Prima, Wholesaler Gouda en the Toys2Play were acquired from the Audax Groep.

Brands

Top1Toys 
Otto Simon's toy stores Wigwam and Speelboom were combined under the formula Top1Toys in 2000. The chain had 110 stores in 2021.

Marskramer 
Marskramer is a chain of 39 stores (in November 2020) that sell homeware. If the store is also a Toys2Play shop, it also sells toys. It was acquired by Audax in 2019 from the Mirage Retail Group. The chain has 36 stores in March 2023.

Former

Novy 
Novy is a homeware and appliances store, founded in 1997. It was a subsidiary of Marskramer with 15 stores (November 2020). These, too, often doubled as Toys2Play stores. Stores it had by Dutch province:
 Gelderland, North Brabant – 4 stores each
 Friesland – 3 stores
 North Holland, South Holland, Utrecht, Zeeland – 1 store each
The Novy stores were rebranded Marskramer after the acquisition by Otto Simon.

Prima 
Prima is a homeware and appliances store. It was a subsidiary of Marskramer with 26 stores (November 2020). Stores it had by Dutch province:
 South Holland – 7 stores
 Limburg, North Brants, Utrecht and Zeeland – 3 stores each
 Drenthe and Overijssel – 2 stores each
 Friesland, Gelderland, North Holland – 1 store each
Prima stores often double as Toys2Play stores. For example, in Limburg 2 out of the 3 stores are also Toys2Play.
The Novy stores were rebranded Marskramer after the acquisition by Otto Simon.

References 

Dutch companies established in 1911
Toy companies of the Netherlands
Almelo